Duopalatinus peruanus, is a species of demersal catfish of the family Pimelodidae that is native to Amazon and Orinoco river basins in Peru.

It grows to a length of 150.0 mm.

References

Pimelodidae
Catfish of South America
Freshwater fish of Peru
Fish of the Amazon basin
Fish described in 1942